The Wollondilly River, an Australian perennial river that is part of the HawkesburyNepean catchment, is located in the Southern Tablelands and Southern Highlands regions of New South Wales. The river meanders from its western slopes near Crookwell, flowing south-east through Goulburn, turning north-east to near Bullio, flowing north-west to Barrallier, before finally heading north-easterly into its mouth at Lake Burragorang.

Course and features
The Wollondilly River was originally a tributary of the Warragamba River, and hence of the HawkesburyNepean catchment. Following the construction of the Warragamba Dam across the Warragamba River, today the river flows into Lake Burragorang, the major water supply for the Greater Sydney region.

It then flows south-east and then east through Goulburn, where it is joined by the Mulwaree River. At Towrang the river turns north-east to a point near Bullio, where it is joined by the Wingecarribee River. From here the Wollondilly River takes a wide detour to the north-west to Barrallier, where it turn east before eventually regaining its north-easterly course into Lake Burragorang.

Wollondilly Shire is a local government area that is named after the Wollondilly River. The name Wollondilly is said to be derived from wallandillii, an Aboriginal word for 'water trickling over rocks'. However, there is no evidence for this in Tharawal language.

See also

 List of rivers of Australia
 List of rivers of New South Wales (L–Z)
 Rivers of New South Wales

References

External links
 
 

Rivers of New South Wales
Southern Highlands (New South Wales)